Ponte de Frieira is a bridge in Portugal. It is located in Bragança District.

See also
List of bridges in Portugal

Bridges in Bragança District
Properties of Public Interest in Portugal
Medieval Portugal
Listed bridges in Portugal